The following is an alphabetical list of articles related to the Commonwealth of Puerto Rico.

0–9

1975 Central American and Caribbean Championships in Athletics
.pr – Internet country code top-level domain for the Commonwealth of Puerto Rico
1993 Central American and Caribbean Games
65th Infantry Regiment (United States)

A

Aerovías Nacionales de Puerto Rico
African immigration to Puerto Rico
Air Culebra
Airports in Puerto Rico
Alfredo Miguel Aguayo Sánchez
Ángel Ramos
Antiguo Casino de Ponce
Antiguo Cuartel Militar Español de Ponce
Antiguo Hospital Militar Español de Ponce
Antilles
Antonio (Nery) Juarbe Pol Airport
Antonio Rivera Rodríguez Airport
Architecture of Puerto Rico
commons:Category:Buildings in Puerto Rico
Area code 787 & 939
Art in Puerto Rico
Atlas of Puerto Rico
Auditorio Juan Pachín Vicéns
Autopistas de Puerto Rico

B

Bairoa Gym
Banco Crédito y Ahorro Ponceño
Banco Crédito y Ahorro Ponceño (building)
Banco de Ponce
Banco de Ponce (building)
Baños de Coamo
Barrios of Ponce:
Anón
Bucaná
Canas
Canas Urbano
Capitanejo
Cerrillos
Coto Laurel
Cuarto
Guaraguao
Machuelo Abajo
Machuelo Arriba
Magueyes
Magueyes Urbano
Maragüez
Marueño
Montes Llanos
Playa
Portugués
Portugués Urbano
Primero
Quebrada Limón
Quinto
Real
Sabanetas
San Antón
San Patricio
Segundo
Sexto
Tercero
Tibes
Vayas
Bayamón City Hall
Birds of Puerto Rico
Black history in Puerto Rico
Bolera Caribe
Boricua
Buildings and structures in Puerto Rico
commons:Category:Buildings and structures in Puerto Rico

C

Caballería
Cadets of the Republic
Café Rico
Caja de Muertos Light
Camp Las Casas
Campo Atlético Charles H. Terry
Cannabis in Puerto Rico
Capital of Puerto Rico:  San Juan
Caribbean
Caribbean Community (CARICOM)
Caribbean Sea
Cardona Island Light
Carnaval de Ponce
Casa Font-Ubides
Caribe Hilton Hotel
Casa Paoli
Casa Fernando Luis Toro
Casa Oppenheimer
Casa Salazar-Candal
Casa Wiechers-Villaronga
Casals Festival
Categories:
:Category:Puerto Rico
:Category:Buildings and structures in Puerto Rico
:Category:Communications in Puerto Rico
:Category:Economy of Puerto Rico
:Category:Education in Puerto Rico
:Category:Environment of Puerto Rico
:Category:Geography of Puerto Rico
:Category:Government of Puerto Rico
:Category:Health in Puerto Rico
:Category:History of Puerto Rico
:Category:Imprisoned Puerto Rican independence activists
:Category:Puerto Rican Jews
:Category:Puerto Rican LGBT people
:Category:Members of the Puerto Rican Nationalist Party
:Category:Military in Puerto Rico
:Category:Politics of Puerto Rico
:Category:Puerto Rican United States Air Force personnel
:Category:Puerto Rican Army personnel
:Category:Puerto Rican culture
:Category:Puerto Rican law
:Category:Puerto Rican military officers
:Category:Puerto Rican military personnel
:Category:Puerto Rican United States Marines
:Category:Puerto Rican nationalists
:Category:Puerto Rican Nationalist Party politicians
:Category:Puerto Rican United States Navy personnel
:Category:Puerto Rican people
:Category:Puerto Rican people by occupation
:Category:Puerto Rican women in the military
:Category:Puerto Rico portal
:Category:Puerto Rico stubs
:Category:Puerto Rico-related lists
:Category:Puerto Rican Spanish Navy personnel
:Category:Society of Puerto Rico
:Category:Transportation in Puerto Rico
:Category:WikiProject Puerto Rico
commons:Category:Puerto Rico

Cementerio Católico San Vicente de Paul
Census statistical areas of Puerto Rico
Centro Cultural de Ponce Carmen Solá de Pereira
Centro de Bellas Artes Luis A. Ferre
Centro de Convenciones de Ponce
Centro Español de Ponce
Chinese immigration to Puerto Rico
Cinema of Puerto Rico
Cities of Puerto Rico
commons:Category:Cities in Puerto Rico
Ciudad Deportiva Millito Navarro
Climate of Puerto Rico
Clásico del Caribe
Club Náutico de Ponce
Coat of Arms of the Commonwealth of Puerto Rico
Colleges and universities in Puerto Rico
commons:Category:Universities and colleges in Puerto Rico
Cristoforo Colombo - Cristóbal Colón - Christopher Columbus
Colegio Ponceño
Colegio San Conrado
Common coquí
Commonwealth of Puerto Rico  (Estado Libre Asociado de Puerto Rico) website
Constitution of the Commonwealth of Puerto Rico
Government of the Commonwealth of Puerto Rico
:Category:Government of Puerto Rico
commons:Category:Government of Puerto Rico
Executive branch of the government of the Commonwealth of Puerto Rico
Governor of the Commonwealth of Puerto Rico
Legislative branch of the government of the Commonwealth of Puerto Rico
Legislative Assembly of the Commonwealth of Puerto Rico
Senate of the Commonwealth of Puerto Rico
House of Representatives of the Commonwealth of Puerto Rico
Judicial branch of the government of the Commonwealth of Puerto Rico
Supreme Court of the Commonwealth of Puerto Rico
Communications in Puerto Rico
:Category:Communications in Puerto Rico
commons:Category:Communications in Puerto Rico
Companies of Puerto Rico
Concha Acústica de Ponce
Constitution of the Commonwealth of Puerto Rico
Coquí
Corsican immigration to Puerto Rico
COVID-19 pandemic in Puerto Rico
Crime in Puerto Rico
Cruce a Nado Internacional
Cuerda
Cuisine of Puerto Rico
Culture of Puerto Rico
Cultural diversity in Puerto Rico

D

Demographics of Puerto Rico
Department of Agriculture of Puerto Rico
Destilería Serrallés
Día Mundial de Ponce
Dominican immigration to Puerto Rico
Dorado Airport
Dupont Plaza Hotel arson

E

Economy of Puerto Rico
:Category:Economy of Puerto Rico
commons:Category:Economy of Puerto Rico
Education in Puerto Rico
:Category:Education in Puerto Rico
commons:Category:Education in Puerto Rico
El Cañuelo
El Nuevo Dia
El Vocero
Elections in the Commonwealth of Puerto Rico
Endemic fauna of Puerto Rico
Endemic flora of Puerto Rico
Environment of Puerto Rico
commons:Category:Environment of Puerto Rico
Estado Libre Asociado de Puerto Rico (Commonwealth of Puerto Rico)
Estadio Francisco Montaner
Eugenio María de Hostos Airport

F

Farmacias El Amal
Fauna of Puerto Rico
FC Leones
Fernando Ribas Dominicci Airport
Festivals in Puerto Rico
Festival Nacional de la Quenepa
commons:Category:Festivals in Puerto Rico
Films set in Puerto Rico
Flag of the Commonwealth of Puerto Rico
Flags of Puerto Rico
Flora of Puerto Rico
Forts in Puerto Rico
Camp Las Casas
Campamento Santiago
Fort Allen
Fort Buchanan
Fort San Cristóbal
Fort San Felipe del Morro
Fortín de San Gerónimo
Losey Field
:Category:Forts in Puerto Rico
commons:Category:Forts in Puerto Rico
Francisco "Paquito" Montaner
Fraternities and sororities in Puerto Rico
French immigration to Puerto Rico

G

Gag Law (Puerto Rico)
Gardens in Puerto Rico
commons:Category:Gardens in Puerto Rico
Geography of Puerto Rico
:Category:Geography of Puerto Rico
commons:Category:Geography of Puerto Rico
Geology of Puerto Rico
German immigration to Puerto Rico
Government of the Commonwealth of Puerto Rico  website
:Category:Government of Puerto Rico
commons:Category:Government of Puerto Rico
Governor of the Commonwealth of Puerto Rico
List of governors of Puerto Rico
Grand Prix de Ponce
Grito de Lares

H

Hacienda Buena Vista
Hacienda Mercedita
High schools of Puerto Rico
Higher education in Puerto Rico
Highway routes in Puerto Rico
Hinduism in Puerto Rico
Hiram Bithorn Stadium
History of Puerto Rico
Historical outline of Puerto Rico
:Category:History of Puerto Rico
commons:Category:History of Puerto Rico
Holidays in Puerto Rico
Hotel Ponce Intercontinental
Hotel Melia
Ponce Ramada Hotel
Hospital Tricoche
Hospital de Damas
Hospital Episcopal San Lucas
Hospital Metropolitano Dr. Pila
House of Representatives of the Commonwealth of Puerto Rico

I

Iglesia de la Santísima Trinidad
Iglesia Metodista Unida de La Playa de Ponce
Iglesia Metodista Unida de Ponce
Industrias Vassallo
Intentona de Yauco
Interamerican University of Puerto Rico at Ponce
International Organization for Standardization (ISO)
ISO 3166-1 alpha-2 country code for Puerto Rico: PR
ISO 3166-1 alpha-3 country code for Puerto Rico: PRI
Internet in Puerto Rico
Interstate Highways in Puerto Rico
Irish immigration to Puerto Rico
Isla Nena Air
Islam in Puerto Rico
Islands of Puerto Rico:
Isla de Puerto Rico
Alcarraza (Puerto Rico)
Bajo Evelyn
Cabeza de Perro
Cayo Ahogado
Cayo Alfenique
Cayo Algodones
Cayo Arenas
Cayo Ballena
Cayo Batata
Cayo Bayo
Cayo Berberia
Cayo Botella
Cayo Cabritas
Cayo Caracoles
Cayo Caribe
Cayo Chiva
Cayo Collado
Cayo Corral
Cayo de Tierra
Cayo del Agua
Cayo Diablo
Cayo Don Luis
Cayo Enrique
Cayo Fanduca
Cayo Icacos
Cayo Jalova
Cayo Jalovita
Cayo Largo del Sur (Puerto Rico)
Cayo Lobito
Cayo Lobo
Cayo Lobos
Cayo Luis Peña
Cayo Maria Langa
Cayo Mata Seca
Cayo Mata - Guayanilla municipality
Cayo Mata - Salinas municipality
Cayo Matojo
Cayo Morrillo
Cayo Norte
Cayo Palomas
Cayo Parguera
Cayo Pinerito
Cayo Pirata
Cayo Puerca
Cayo Raton
Cayo Ratones - Cabo Rojo municipality
Cayo Ratones - Fajardo municipality
Cayo Real
Cayo Rio
Cayo Santiago
Cayo Sombrerito
Cayo Terremoto
Cayo Tiburon
Cayo Verde
Cayo Vieques
Cayo Yerba
Cayos Cabezazos
Cayos Caribes
Cayos de Barca
Cayos de Caña Gorda
Cayos de Caracoles
Cayos de Pajaros
Cayos de Ratones
Cayos Geniqui
El Ancon
El Mono
Isla Cabras
Isla Caja de Muertos
Isla Chiva
Isla Cueva
Isla Culebra
Isla Culebrita
Isla de Cabras
Isla de Cardona
Isla de Cerro Gordo
Isla de Gatas
Isla de Jueyes
Isla de las Palomas
Isla de Mona (Puerto Rico)
Isla de Ramos
Isla de Ratones (Ponce)
Isla de Vieques
Isla del Frío
Isla Desecheo (Puerto Rico)
Isla Guachinanga
Isla Guayacan
Isla La Cancora
Isla Magueyes
Isla Matei
Isla Monito (Puerto Rico)
Morrillito
Isla Palominitos
Isla Palominos
Isla Piedra
Isla Pineros
Isla Puerca
Isla San Juan
Isla Yallis
Isletas de Garzas
Islote de Juan Perez
Islote Numero dos
La Blanquilla
 La Cordillera
Las Cabritas
Las Cucarachas
Las Hermanas
Las Lavanderas del Este
Las Lavanderas del Oeste
Los Farallones
Los Gemelos
Los Negritos
Mata Redonda
Pela (Puerto Rico)
Pelaita
Penon Brusi
Penon de Afuera
Penon de San Jorge
Piedra del Norte
Piedra Stevens
Piragua de Adentro
Piragua de Afuera
Punta Larga (Puerto Rico)
Punta Mosquitos
Roca Alcatraz
Roca Cocinera
Roca Cucaracha
Roca Culumna
Roca Ola
Roca Resuello
Roca Speck
Roca Velasquez
Tres Hermanas
Tres Hermanos
Islands of the Caribbean

J

Jayuya Uprising
Jewish immigration to Puerto Rico
Jose Miguel Agrelot Coliseum
Juan Ramón Loubriel Stadium

L

"La Borinqueña"
La Fortaleza
La Guancha
Lakes in Puerto Rico
:Category:Lakes of Puerto Rico
commons:Category:Lakes of Puerto Rico
Landmarks in Puerto Rico
commons:Category:Landmarks in Puerto Rico
Las Justas
Latin America
Law enforcement in Puerto Rico
Legislative Assembly of the Commonwealth of Puerto Rico
Leonas de Ponce
Leones de Ponce (basketball)
Leones de Ponce (baseball)
LGBT rights in Puerto Rico
:Category:Puerto Rican LGBT people
Lists related to Puerto Rico:
Grasses of Puerto Rico
Historical outline of Puerto Rico
List of airports in Puerto Rico
List of amphibians and reptiles of Puerto Rico
List of barrios of Ponce, Puerto Rico
List of birds of Puerto Rico
List of buildings and structures in Puerto Rico
List of census statistical areas in Puerto Rico
List of cities in Puerto Rico
List of colleges and universities in Puerto Rico
List of companies of Puerto Rico
List of countries by GDP (nominal)
List of companies in Puerto Rico
List of endemic fauna of Puerto Rico
List of endemic flora of Puerto Rico
List of events in Ponce, Puerto Rico
List of films set in Puerto Rico
List of forts in Puerto Rico
List of fraternities and sororities in Puerto Rico
List of governors of Puerto Rico
List of high schools in Puerto Rico
List of highway routes in Puerto Rico
List of islands of Puerto Rico
List of lakes in Puerto Rico
List of lighthouses in Puerto Rico
List of Major League Baseball players from Puerto Rico
List of mayors of Ponce, Puerto Rico
List of mountains in Ponce, Puerto Rico
List of mountains of Puerto Rico
List of municipalities of Puerto Rico
List of museums in Puerto Rico
List of newspapers in Puerto Rico
List of people from Ponce, Puerto Rico
List of players from Puerto Rico in Major League Baseball
List of political parties in Puerto Rico
List of Puerto Rican Academy Award winners and nominees
List of Puerto Rican comedians
List of Puerto Rican military personnel
List of Puerto Rican recipients of the Medal of Honor
List of Puerto Rican rums
List of Puerto Rican slang words and phrases
List of Puerto Rican writers
List of Puerto Ricans
List of Puerto Ricans of African descent
List of Puerto Rico Highways
List of Puerto Rican Presidential Citizens Medal recipients
List of Puerto Rican Presidential Medal of Freedom recipients 
List of Puerto Rico state forests
List of Puerto Rico-related topics
List of radio stations in Puerto Rico
List of Registered Historic Places in Puerto Rico
List of residents of San Juan, Puerto Rico
List of rivers of Ponce
List of rivers of Puerto Rico
List of Tainos
List of theaters in Ponce, Puerto Rico
List of television stations in Puerto Rico
List of universities and colleges in Puerto Rico
List of World Heritage Sites in Puerto Rico
Municipalities of Puerto Rico
National Register of Historic Places listings in Puerto Rico
Puerto Rican recipients of the Distinguished Service Cross
Puerto Rican recipients of the Navy Cross
Literature of Puerto Rico
Lizzie Graham
Los Chinos de Ponce
Los Garcia
Luis Muñoz Marín International Airport
Luis A. Ferré
Luis A. Ferré United States Courthouse and Post Office Building

M

Major League Baseball players from Puerto Rico
commons:Category:Maps of Puerto Rico
Mar Caribe
Mass media in Puerto Rico
Media of Puerto Rico
Menudo
Mercado de las Carnes
Mercedita Airport
Military history of Puerto Rico
Military of Puerto Rico
Military personnel of Puerto Rico
Miss Puerto Rico
Mona ground iguana
Monumento a la abolición de la exclavitud
Monumento a los heroes de El Polvorín (obelisk)
Monumento a los heroes de El Polvorín (tomb)
Monumento al Jíbaro Puertorriqueño
Mountains of Puerto Rico
commons:Category:Mountains of Puerto Rico
Municipalities of the Commonwealth of Puerto Rico
commons:Category:Municipalities in Puerto Rico
Museums in Puerto Rico
:Category:Museums in Puerto Rico
commons:Category:Museums in Puerto Rico
Museo de Arte de Ponce
Museo de la Masacre de Ponce
Museo Francisco "Pancho" Coimbre
Music of Puerto Rico
commons:Category:Music of Puerto Rico
:Category:Puerto Rican musical groups
:Category:Puerto Rican musicians

N

National anthem of Puerto Rico
National Forests of Puerto Rico
commons:Category:National Forests of Puerto Rico
Natural history of Puerto Rico
commons:Category:Natural history of Puerto Rico
Navy-Culebra protests
Navy-Vieques protests
New Progressive Party of Puerto Rico
Newspapers of Puerto Rico
Nightlife in Ponce, Puerto Rico
Normandie Hotel
North Atlantic Ocean
Northern Hemisphere
Nuyorican Movement
Nuyorican Poets Cafe

O
Outline of Puerto Rico

P

Palmas Del Mar Beach Resort
Panteón Nacional Román Baldorioty de Castro
Parque de Bombas
Parque de la Abolición
Parque de la Ceiba
Parque del Retiro
Parque del Tricentenario (Ponce, Puerto Rico)
Parque Ecológico Urbano
Parque Familiar Julio Enrique Monagas
Parque Lineal Veredas del Labrador
Parque Luis A. Wito Morales
Parque Pedro Albizu Campos
Parque Urbano Dora Colón Clavell
Paseo Atocha
Plaza Degetau
Plaza del Caribe
Plaza Las Delicias
Plaza Muñoz Rivera
Pedro Albizu Campos
People of Puerto Rico
List of Puerto Ricans
:Category:People by city in Puerto Rico
Piragua
Plaza del Mercado de Ponce
Political parties in Puerto Rico
Political status of Puerto Rico
Politics of Puerto Rico
:Category:Politics of Puerto Rico
commons:Category:Politics of Puerto Rico
Ponce
Ponce Cathedral
Ponce Cement, Inc.
Ponce City Hall
Ponce Creole
Ponce Grand Prix
Ponce High School
Ponce Jazz Festival
Ponce massacre
Ponce Municipal Police
Ponce School of Medicine
Ponce Servicios
Ponce YMCA Building
Pontifical Catholic University of Puerto Rico
Pontifical Catholic University of Puerto Rico School of Architecture
Pontifical Catholic University of Puerto Rico School of Law
Popular Democratic Party
Porta Caribe
Porta Coeli
PR – United States Postal Service postal code for the Commonwealth of Puerto Rico
PR-9
PR-12
PR-123
PR-132
PR-133
PR-139
PR-143
PR-163
PR-500
PR-501
PR-502
PR-503
PR-504
PR-505
PR-506
PR-511
PR-577
PR-578
PR-585
PR-591
President's Task Force on Puerto Rico's Status
Prinair Flight 191
Prominent Puerto Ricans
Proposed political status for Puerto Rico
Protestants in Puerto Rico
Public holidays in Puerto Rico
Puerto Rico (proposed state)
Puerto Rican people
Puerto Rican accents
Puerto Rican Academy Award winners and nominees
Puerto Ricans
Puerto Rican amazon parrot
Puerto Rican Athenaeum
Puerto Rican dry forests
Puerto Rican emerald hummingbird
Puerto Rican immigration to Hawaii
Puerto Rican Independence Movement
Puerto Rican Independence Party
Puerto Rican migration to New York
Puerto Rican military personnel
Puerto Rican Nationalist Party Revolts of the 1950s
Puerto Rican Operating Area
Puerto Rican phrases, words and slangs
Puerto Rican recipients of the Presidential Citizens Medal 
Puerto Rican recipients of the Presidential Medal of Freedom 
Puerto Rican recipients of the Distinguished Service Cross
Puerto Rican recipients of the Medal of Honor
Puerto Rican recipients of the Navy Cross
Puerto Rican scientists and inventors
Puerto Rican Spanish
Puerto Rican status referendum, 2012
Puerto Rican status referendum, 2017 
Puerto Rican tody
Puerto Rican women in the military
Puerto Ricans
People by city in Puerto Rico
commons:Category:People of Puerto Rico
Puerto Ricans in NASA
Puerto Ricans in the United States (Stateside Puerto Ricans)
Puerto Ricans Missing in Action - Korean War
Puerto Ricans Missing in Action - Vietnam War
Puerto Ricans in World War I
Puerto Ricans in World War II
Puerto Ricans in the Vietnam War
Puerto Rico  website
:Category:Puerto Rico
commons:Category:Puerto Rico
commons:Category:Maps of Puerto Rico
Puerto Rico at the Olympics
Puerto Rico Convention Center
Puerto Rico Media
Puerto Rico Tax and Customs Laws
Puerto Rico Statehood Students Association
Puerto Rico Trench
Puerto Rico Iron Works

Q
 Quebrada Limón

R

Radio stations in Puerto Rico
Rafael Carmoega
Rafael Hernández Airport
Rafael Hernández Colón
Rafael Cordero Santiago Port of the Americas
Rail transport in Puerto Rico
Ramon Power y Giralt
Registered historic places in Puerto Rico
commons:Category:Registered Historic Places in Puerto Rico
Religion in Puerto Rico
:Category:Religion in Puerto Rico
commons:Category:Religion in Puerto Rico
Residencia Armstrong-Poventud
Residencia Ermelindo Salazar
Residencia Subirá
Residencial Las Casas
Resident Commissioner of Puerto Rico
Resorts in Puerto Rico
commons:Category:Resorts in Puerto Rico
Rivers of Ponce
Rio Anón
Río Bayagán
Río Blanco 
Río Bucaná 
Río Cañas
Río Cerrillos 
Río Chiquito
Río Inabón 
Río Jacaguas 
Río Matilde 
Río Pastillo 
Río Portugués 
Río Prieto 
Río San Patricio 
Rivers of Puerto Rico
commons:Category:Rivers of Puerto Rico
Roberto Clemente Coliseum
Roosevelt Roads Naval Station
Rosaly-Batiz House
Royal Decree of Graces of 1815
Ruben Berrios

S

San Juan Bay
San Juan – Capital of Puerto Rico since 1521
San Juan National Historic Site
San Juan ship dock
San Juan Uprising
School of Tropical Medicine
Scouting in Puerto Rico
Senate of the Commonwealth of Puerto Rico
SITRAS
Sovereigntism (Puerto Rico)
Spanish colonization of the Americas
Spanish language
Spanish immigration to Puerto Rico
Sports in Puerto Rico
:Category:Sports in Puerto Rico
commons:Category:Sports in Puerto Rico
:Category:Sports venues in Puerto Rico
commons:Category:Sports venues in Puerto Rico
Structures in Puerto Rico
commons:Category:Buildings and structures in Puerto Rico
Statehood movement in Puerto Rico 
Supreme Court of the Commonwealth of Puerto Rico
Symbols of the Commonwealth of Puerto Rico

T

Taínos
Teatro Fox Delicias
Teatro Puerto Rico
Teatro Yagüez
Telecommunications in Puerto Rico
:Category:Communications in Puerto Rico
commons:Category:Communications in Puerto Rico
Telemundo
Television shows set in Puerto Rico
Television stations in Puerto Rico
Tibes Indigenous Ceremonial Center
Theatres in Puerto Rico
commons:Category:Theatres in Puerto Rico
Tourism in Puerto Rico  website
:Category:Tourism in Puerto Rico
commons:Category:Tourism in Puerto Rico
Transportation in Puerto Rico
:Category:Transportation in Puerto Rico
commons:Category:Transport in Puerto Rico
Tren Urbano
T.U.S.C.A.

U

United States Customs House (Ponce, Puerto Rico)
University of Puerto Rico at Ponce
Utuado Uprising

V

Vieques Air Link
Villa sin Miedo
Villa Pesquera
Voting rights in Puerto Rico

W

WAPA (AM)
Water parks in Puerto Rico
Western Hemisphere
Wikimedia
commons:Atlas of Puerto Rico
commons:Category:Puerto Rico
commons:Category:Maps of Puerto Rico
Wikinews:Category:Puerto Rico
Wikinews:Portal:Puerto Rico
Wikipedia Category:Puerto Rico
Wikipedia Portal:Puerto Rico
History of women in Puerto Rico
Wilfred Benítez
Wilfredo Gómez
Wilfredo Vazquez
World Heritage Sites in Puerto Rico
commons:Category:World Heritage Sites in Puerto Rico
WLEO
WPAB
WPRP
WPUC-FM

X
 Xander Zayas

See also

Topic overview:
Puerto Rico
Outline of Puerto Rico

References

External links

 
Puerto Rico